Santa Bárbara (Portuguese meaning Saint Barbara) is a village in the northeastern part of the island of Brava, Cape Verde. It is situated at 350 m elevation, close to the Atlantic coast. It is about 1 kilometer east of the island capital of Nova Sintra. To its southeast is the small village of Vinagre. Santa Bárbara can be reached by "Aluguer" buses.

References

Villages and settlements in Brava, Cape Verde